River Eye SSSI is a  biological Site of Special Scientific Interest covering a stretch of the River Eye between Ham Bridge, north-west of Stapleford, and the eastern outskirts of Melton Mowbray in Leicestershire. It is a Nature Conservation Review site.

This unpolluted clay stream has rich and diverse flora and fauna. Marginal vegetation includes bulrush, branched bur-reed and  greater pond sedge, while shallow, fast-flowing stretches have curled pondweed and perfoliate pondweed.

The river runs through private land but it is crossed by roads and footpaths.

References

Sites of Special Scientific Interest in Leicestershire